The Machine's Child is a science fiction novel by American writer Kage Baker. It is the seventh book in the series concerning the exploits of Dr. Zeus Inc., otherwise known as The Company.

Plot introduction 
Several elements introduced as far back as the fourth book The Graveyard Game develop in this volume.  Most of the characters are immortal cyborgs created in the past by an organization, Dr. Zeus Inc., which exists in the 24th century and has both time travel and immortality technology.

The official business of Dr. Zeus is the "finding", for a fee, of artifacts and living things thought lost to time, which have actually been carefully collected by the cyborgs known as Preservers, aided by the fixers, conmen and masters of deception known as Facilitators.

Alec Checkerfield, introduced in The Life of the World to Come, is trying to  find his lost love, the Preserver known as the Botanist Mendoza.  With the aid of his AI helper "Captain Morgan" and their time travelling schooner using technology stolen from Dr. Zeus, he aims to find her wherever and whenever she is.

This is complicated by the fact that he is hosting the personalities of his two dead clones, Nicholas Harpole and Edward Alton Bell-Fairfax, in his own partially cyborged body.  All three personalities knew Mendoza in the flesh, so to speak, but each has his own way of looking at the world.  Nicholas is a religious zealot, Edward a cold-blooded killer, and Alec is the squeamish product of a culture that prohibits or represses everything enjoyed by humans in the past, including religion, sex, and violence.

The Facilitator Joseph is reviving his "father", the ancient Enforcer cyborg Budu, as the 24th century opens.  To him, Alec Checkerfield represents his nemesis and the one responsible for the downfall of Mendoza, who he regards as a daughter.  As Budu re-assembles his shattered body, Joseph plunders the archives  of Dr. Zeus, learning about the Adonai project which created Alec, Nicholas and Edward.  He tries to bring down Adonai by any means possible, including tracking Alec through time.

Executive Facilitator Suleyman is using his power base in North Africa to prepare for the year 2355, when the Company apparently suffers such a setback that no transmissions from the time beyond have ever been received.  He gathers trusted operatives to his base, while hoping that Joseph, whom he revived and cast out as a rogue, untraceable and answerable to nobody, will not bring disaster about by reviving Budu, the oldest and most powerful Enforcer.

Budu is enduring the decades-long process of self-repair, having been buried for 370 years, body cut apart, in rubble after the San Francisco earthquake.  He knows far more about the Company than Joseph dared believe.  Passing this knowledge to Joseph, he prepares his own surprise for Dr. Zeus.

Alec's AI, Captain Morgan, is also creating surprises to bedevil the Company in 2355.  Alec drops these in strategic places at different times in history.

Explanation of the novel's title
Mendoza needs careful reviving after 900 years in the Company hell known as "Options Research".  Since Capt. Morgan ran the apparatus that resulted in her rebirth, he likes to call her "the Machine's child".

This is also a nod to a passionate conversation held by Mendoza and the first incarnation of the Adonai (Nicholas Harpole) during the 'first' novel of The Company stories, In the Garden of Iden.

Plot summary

At the end of The Life of the World to Come, Alec Checkerfield, aboard his schooner the Captain Morgan, crewed and piloted by the eponymous AI he created from a teaching computer given to him as a child, had escaped from Dr. Zeus' installation on Santa Catalina Island with information stolen from the Company databases.  Using this information the Captain turned the ship into a time machine, leaving the year 2351 to hide in history.  Along the way Alec found and lost Mendoza, unwittingly downloaded his alter egos into his own brain, and equally unwittingly was party to one of the most infamous massacres in human history, the destruction of the colony Mars Two by terrorists.  As a result, Alec is wracked with guilt, and thus weakened he falls prey to the other personalities, especially the former assassin Edward.  In a bizarre joint effort they break in and steal from the Nuevo Inklings in 2351 more information in the form of a buke, a 24th-century notebook computer.  Thus fortified they disappear into time to plot the rescue of Mendoza.

The Captain begins talking to the personalities individually as he creates the  plan.  Mendoza is in "Options Research", 300,000 years in the past.  This is a facility dedicated to finding ways to kill cyborgs, using Preservers who have lost their will to live as guinea pigs.  Only one Company operative is there, but it is Marco, the only Enforcer other than Budu to remain free once the Enforcers original mission was completed.  Instead of being placed in suspended animation like the other Enforcers, he was sent to run Options Research where he systematically disassembles cyborgs and subjects them to horrendous treatments in an attempt to destroy them.

Alec and the Captain arrive from the future, with Edward in control of their body to carry out the mission.  This is fortunate, as the horrors created by Marco sicken Nicholas and Alec.  They find Mendoza, who has been lying in a steel coffin for 900 years, disabling Marco in the process.  The Captain has duplicated the virus that brought down Budu, although Edward is only able to inject it by sheer luck.  Mendoza is in dreadful condition; her coffin is only 1 meter long.

In the year 2317, Joseph is still waiting for Budu to finish regenerating after rescuing him in 2276.  He lives in a corner of the revival facility under Mount Tamalpais, near San Francisco, stealing food, clothing and other equipment as he needs them.  Lately he has been playing the role of visiting handyman and lover to Mavis, the landlady of the nearby Pelican Inn.  Budu finally awakes, despite being blind and unable to communicate.  Joseph steals a vocoder and hooks it into Budu's systems so he can hear and talk.

Budu tells his story about what happened to him after he escaped from Company custody in 1099.  Becoming a rogue like Joseph, he roamed Europe until the Black Death gave him the idea of using disease to cull humanity of its violent members.  Contacting his various recruits, like Labienus, he formed the Plague Cabal, which began creating diseases designed to kill target populations quickly and then die out before spreading to the rest of humanity.  Labienus, however, had visions of reducing human population on a global scale, committing genocide, and caused Budu's downfall at the hands of Victor,  who had unwittingly been made into a carrier of targeted viruses.

Joseph finds a time-travel capsule that Budu had hidden on Morro Rock and goes to Options Research in search of Mendoza.  He arrives well after Alec has left, and is attacked by Marco even as he lies ill with the virus.  After Marco calms down, he tells Joseph what happened, before wading into the sea, presumably to hide himself from the Company, who he now believes is after him.  Joseph, horrified by what he sees and failing to find Mendoza, returns to the 24th century and contacts Suleyman, who mounts a mission to rescue the cyborgs held at Options Research and expose it to all the other active Company operatives still alive.

With knowledge supplied by Budu, Joseph begins to ransack Company databases for information about Mendoza, his friend Lewis, and the Adonai project which created Alec, Edward and Nicholas.  Over the last few decades he had lost some of his grip on reality and thus became obsessed with destroying Adonai.  Knowing that Alec is born in 2320, he brings Alec's "parents", the Earl and Countess of Finsbury, to the Pelican so he can prevent Alec's conception.  To his dismay he finds that they had long ago decided not to have children and Roger had been medically sterilized.  In reality, Alec was born to a host mother and given to the Checkerfields by the Company.

Alec and his phantom companions are finally able to hold their beloved once the Captain, using his own version of the Company revival tank, rebuilds her.  She has lost most of her memories, though there are indications the Captain may have blocked them to protect her sanity.  One side effect is that the Company conditioning which suppressed her paranormal abilities has been removed, and she constantly creates temporal anomalies around her when her emotions are aroused.  The typical result is that plants seem to grow with incredible speed.  The ship is soon a floating greenhouse.

The Captain meanwhile has been digesting the Company data.  He can make Alec immortal like Mendoza, who thinks he is already immortal like her.  He can create devices using nanotechnology that the Company, slow and bureaucratic, had never thought to build.  Alec and Mendoza proceed to drop small time-bombs in the form of collections of nanobots throughout history.  Meanwhile, a search for Alec's original genetic template, which the Captain needs for the immortality treatment, turns up the mortal remains of both Edward and Nicholas, hidden in Company repositories; this is a shock for each of Alec's mental passengers.

Eventually they locate Alpha-Omega, a secret facility where genetic templates for all operatives, and indeed every kind of human who has ever existed, are stored.  Before doing this Alec insists on a vacation, and since he is obsessed with his romantic vision of pirates, he decides to go to Port Royal, Jamaica, in its heyday before being destroyed by an earthquake in 1692.

Joseph and Budu have been studying Alec, and have realized that he is likely to visit Port Royal.  Joseph sets himself up in the less rowdy inland community of Spanish Town, ready to wait years for their arrival, equipped with a device that can detect and jam the Captain's signals.

Alec arrives with Mendoza, though he is quickly repelled by the place, and is only able to continue with help from Edward and Nicholas, who are not bothered by such horrors as abattoirs, meat markets, pet animals, thugs and pirates.  By way of celebrating their impending triumph over Dr. Zeus, Alec and Mendoza, helped considerably by Nicholas' passion and poetry, marry themselves and enjoy a belated honeymoon in a harbor inn.  Joseph has had the misfortune to be away from his home when his alarm is activated, and when he returns the couple are gone.  After an exhausting journey he finds the Captain Morgan at anchor and sneaks aboard, after disabling the Captain with a signal jammer.  Confronting the man he thinks of as Alec Checkerfield, he is astonished to be attacked by the Nicholas personality.  Knocking Alec out, he interrogates him when he revives, but finds himself dealing with Edward.  At that point Mendoza erupts from the cabin of the ship, and the Captain defeats the jamming and activates the ship's defenses.  Mendoza does not recognize Joseph, who realizes that whatever he thinks, Alec, Edward and Nicholas genuinely love her.  He flees and returns to Budu.  From Budu's point of view, Joseph has been gone a few days.  From Joseph's viewpoint, it has been 20 years.

Alec's injuries from the fight require even more recuperation.  In a resort in 2276 they play a violent video game that is illegal in Alec's time.  Edward beats the game, literally burning it out.  As a result, he becomes Alec's equal in cyberspace, though this is unknown to the others.

Finally raiding Alpha-Omega, on an island in 500,000 BCE, they bypass the AI and the single human attendant it protects, and recover the Adonai genetic template.  With the Captain distracted by the other AI, Edward takes over Alec and confines the other personalities to a virtual prison.  His bravado is short-lived, however.  Alec and Nicholas attempt to escape, distracting Edward when he is attacked by an ichthyosaur while wading into the sea.  Gravely injured, he attempts to transfer his personality into Mendoza's systems, but the result leaves her catatonic.

The Captain is left to pick up the pieces.  The final scene is enigmatic, and a cliff hanger.  Mendoza is "rebooted", but the Captain seems to have obtained human form.  He implies that Alec and Nicholas are still trapped in Mendoza's mind and, strangely, calls her "mother".

Characters
 Mendoza, a significant character in three previous books and an important voice in the series, is relatively passive and almost silent in this story.  Having lost most of her memory she is only aware that she loves plants and has encountered Alec, or Edward, or Nicholas before and loved him/them.  In this state, however, her unleashed paranormal ability, generating "Crome radiation", allows the AI Captain Morgan to find a way to bring Mendoza into her own future, which for her is after 1863.
 Joseph has also lost much of what made him tick.  He has lost the thing he needed most, to belong to the Company.  Instead he finds refuge in his attachment to Budu, his father, and his desire for justice for Mendoza and his other lost friends.
 Budu does not emerge much in the story, merely providing a way for Joseph to get access to information, money, and equipment.  His resources and the nature of his plan to bring down Dr. Zeus are not revealed, although they apparently involve an immortal William Randolph Hearst, posing as his own descendant.
 Alec, along with Nicholas and Edward, becomes outwardly more stable even as the older personalities become stronger.  Nicholas expounds on his Christian faith and how it fails to explain his current situation.  Edward expresses his faith in Reason, shorn of passion and superstition, as the only hope for them and humanity.  Alec represents the third aspect of history, as Edward sees it.  If Nicholas is Faith and Edward is Reason, Alec is blind Technology which has no purpose until Reason takes control of it.
 Captain Morgan, once a mere teaching machine, has grown beyond reason until he can accomplish almost anything for Alec.  Only when Edward impetuously disconnects the device linking Alec to the Captain, or when the Captain's systems are jammed, does the human part of the symbiosis function as an independent actor.  When the Captain is in charge, Alec's personalities have little to do but argue with each other.
 Marco the Enforcer, as described in Sky Coyote, wanted to lead his own army of Enforcers to purge humanity of killers and other malefactors once the original mission of stopping the pernicious Great Goat Cult was complete.  Instead he was sent into the past to run Options Research.  Having created cyborgs that are literally indestructible, the Company is desperate to find ways to destroy them.
 William Randolph Hearst, as related in a story "Welcome to Olympus, Mr. Hearst!" in Gods and Pawns, has been given a version of immortality by the Company, and masquerades as his own descendant in 2320.  His part in the plan is  yet to be revealed.

Major themes
Beginning with the first volume the series concentrated on telling small stories in a large context.  Much space was given to period detail, in Elizabethan England, pre-Spanish California, Old California during the American Civil War, and various future events, both real and imagined.  With the fourth volume, The Graveyard Game, a transition to exposition of the greater plot took place, though period vignettes appeared as well.

This volume is heavy on plot exposition but also returns to earlier themes, allowing the author to revel in her knowledge of Elizabethan English once more, as in In The Garden of Iden.  Real people such as William Shakespeare and Robert Louis Stevenson appear.  Alec is an admirer of Stevenson for writing Treasure Island, his favorite book.  Edward is a great admirer of Shakespeare.  Both are apparently important to the author, also.

Alec and the Captain pursue their mission in stages while Joseph, in pursuing Alec, becomes aware of the larger Adonai plot, discharging his obsession with Nicholas Harpole and the safety of Mendoza.  This clears his mind to concentrate on dealing with the future, and finding his other lost friends.

Alec himself has to reconcile himself to his past crimes before his deathwish brings him, and his co-personalities, to an untimely end.  He also has to avoid a takeover by Edward, who is learning how to "write code" in their shared virtual world.  Edward may not have a deathwish, but his recklessness poses just as much risk.  Nicholas' passion can also endanger their body, as when he takes over in his rage to attack Joseph, who is physically capable of breaking him in two.

Suleyman and his allies are mostly on the sidelines, bearing witness to the coming of a future they dread as the long-awaited signs, such as the Company issuing badges consisting of a clock with no hands, begin to appear.

The appearance of a live ichthyosaur at the end echoes Mendoza's discovery of a recently dead member of that species during her exile on Santa Catalina Island, as recounted in The Life of the World to Come.   Since both events take place in times millions of years after the supposed extinction of ichthyosaurs, this may imply that time is somehow "out of joint" around Company bases.  Company stories such as "The Catch", as well as The Life of the World to Come, refer to "variable permeability of the time continuum" occurring when a particular time and place has repeated time journeys made to it.

Novels about time travel
2006 American novels
Novels by Kage Baker
2006 science fiction novels
Tor Books books
Sterilization in fiction
Cyborgs in literature
Novels about artificial intelligence
Novels about cloning
Nanotechnology in fiction
Novels set in prison
Novels about virtual reality